Gina Aliotti (born July 20, 1984) is an IFBB professional figure competitor. She is well known for her wins in the IFBB woman's figure professional circuit including wins at the Tournament of Champions Pro Figure (2006, 2007, and 2008), the West Palm Beach Pro Figure (2007), and the Arnold Classic Pro Figure (2007). She is owner of GinaAliotti.com (M&GFitness) through which she and her team conduct sales and consulting for exercise and nutrition.

Contest History

See also
List of female fitness & figure competitors

References

External links
Official Site
bodybuilding.com Interview (video), 2009
bodybuilding.com Interview, 2008
TMuscle Feature, 2006
tmuscle.com Interview (Audio), 2006

Living people
1984 births
Place of birth missing (living people)
Fitness and figure competitors
Sportspeople from Monterey, California
American sportswomen
21st-century American women